United Nations Security Council Resolution 310, adopted on February 4, 1972, after reaffirming previous resolutions on the topic, the Council strongly condemned repressive measures against the African laborers in Namibia and called upon all nations and corporations operating in Namibia to use whatever means available to ensure that operations there conform to the Universal Declaration of Human Rights.

The Council ended by condemning South Africa for the continued presence of its police and military forces and decided that if South Africa failed to abide by the present resolution it would meet immediately to decide upon effective steps and measures to implement it and requested the Secretary-General report back to them no later than July 31.

The resolution was adopted by 13 votes; France and the United Kingdom abstained from voting.

See also
 List of United Nations Security Council Resolutions 301 to 400 (1971–1976)
 South West Africa

References
Text of the Resolution at undocs.org

External links
 

 0310
 0310
 0310
February 1972 events